"Oh Baby" is a 1954 song written by Walter Jacobs and Willie Dixon, first recorded by Jacobs as Little Walter And His Jukes in 1954. The song has been covered by Led Zeppelin, Kim Wilson and many others.

References

1954 songs
Little Walter songs
Songs written by Little Walter
Songs written by Willie Dixon
Checker Records singles
1954 singles